Bosung Girls' High School is a private girls high school located in Yongsan-dong, Yongsan-gu, Seoul.

History
The school was founded on October 10, 1907, under the name Bosung Girls' School (보성여학교). The current principal Nam Myung-hwal was appointed on February 7, 2013, as the school's 15th principal.

Notable alumni
 Park Mi-sun 
 Choi Eun-hee 
 Shim Hye-jin

References

External links
 

High schools in Seoul
Yongsan District
Educational institutions established in 1907
Girls' schools in South Korea
1907 establishments in Korea